Diego Sebastián Romano (born 2 March 1980 in Rosario, Santa Fe) is an Argentine footballer who plays as a midfielder for Greek  football Club AO Perachoras

Club career

Early years
Romano began his career in Argentina, making one appearance for Newell's Old Boys in the Argentine Primera División during the Apertura 2000 tournament.

Ergotelis
On 25 June 2008, Romano signed a two-year contract with Greek Superleague side Ergotelis. He went on to stay for six consecutive seasons with the club, featuring in 154 official matches and scoring 18 goals. During the 2011–12 season, Romano suffered ACL rupture, thus being unable to help his club avoid relegation to the Football League after six straight seasons in top-flight. He was one of the few club veterans to follow Ergotelis in the Football League, captaining the club and leading them to instant promotion back to top-flight. In his final season with the club, Romano captained the team to its best-ever 7th place finish in the 2013−14 Greek Superleague. However, as the club's board of directors decided to cut down on the team's budget and offer key players new contracts with reduced pay, Romano decided to part ways with Ergotelis on July 17, 2014.

Iraklis
Four days after his release from Ergotelis on July 21 2014, Romano signed a two-year contract with Greek Football League club Iraklis. He made his debut for Iraklis in a Greek Cup match against Lamia. Romano was joined by fellow countryman Emanuel Perrone, and the duo majorly contributed to Iraklis' return to the Greek Superleague during the 2014–15 Football League season. After playing for Iraklis during the 2015–16 Superleague season, both players mutually terminated their contracts with the club in May 2016.

Apollon Smyrni
On 25 June 2016, Romano joined Football League club Apollon Smyrni on a one-year deal until the summer of 2017. He once again helped his club earn promotion to the Superleague, this time as division champions. He featured in 23 matches for Apollon, and scored one goal in his club's 2016–17 Football League championship run.

Ethnikos Piraeus
In July 2017, Romano signed with Gamma Ethniki side Ethnikos Piraeus.

Career statistics

Honours

Club
Apollon Smyrni
Football League: 2016–17

Individual
Football League Best Player: 2012−13

References

External links

1980 births
Living people
Footballers from Buenos Aires
Argentine footballers
Newell's Old Boys footballers
Tiro Federal footballers
Club Almagro players
Chacarita Juniors footballers
San Martín de Tucumán footballers
Ergotelis F.C. players
Iraklis Thessaloniki F.C. players
Apollon Smyrnis F.C. players
Ethnikos Piraeus F.C. players
Argentine Primera División players
Super League Greece players
Football League (Greece) players
Argentine expatriate footballers
Expatriate footballers in Greece
Association football midfielders